A Cloud of Red Dust is the debut album by jazz vibraphonist Stefon Harris. It was recorded in 1997 and released by Blue Note Records.

Recording and music
The album was recorded in October 1997. Most of the material was composed by Harris. For the album release, the tracks were connected with "short interludes to create an almost continuous suite".

Release and reception
A Cloud of Red Dust was released by Blue Note Records. The Penguin Guide to Jazz commented on Harris's "flowing lyricism, grafted onto a swinging shuffle beat, a combination of metres that is always threatening to fall apart but never quite does". The AllMusic reviewer concluded: "As a whole, A Cloud of Red Dust offers a fine baseline from which to track Stefon Harris' development as perhaps the next great vibraphone stylist."

Track listing 
All tracks composed by Stefon Harris; except where noted.

Personnel
Stefon Harris – vibraphone, balafon, orchestra bells
Dwayne Burno – double bass
Kamati Dinizulu – harp, percussions
June Gardner – vocals
Alvester Garnett – drums
Mulgrew Miller, Jason Moran – piano
Greg Osby – alto saxophone
Steve Turre – trombone, shells
Kaoru Watanabe – flute
Steve Wilson – alto saxophone, soprano saxophone
Technical
Jim Anderson - recording, mixing
Deborah Feingold - photography

References

1998 debut albums
Stefon Harris albums
Blue Note Records albums